Flexopteron primanova is a species of sea snail, a marine gastropod mollusk in the family Muricidae, the murex snails or rock snails.

Description
The length of an adult shell attains 15 mm.

Distribution
This species occurs in the Indian Ocean off Madagascar.

References

 Merle D., Garrigues B. & Pointier J.-P. (2011) Fossil and Recent Muricidae of the world. Part Muricinae. Hackenheim: Conchbooks. 648 pp. page(s): 169

External links
 

Muricinae
Gastropods described in 1985